The 2019 VBA season was the fourth season of the Vietnam Basketball Association. The regular season began on 1 June 2019 and ended on 18 August 2019. The playoffs began on 24 August 2019 and ended on 31 August 2019. The finals began on 7 September 2019 and ended on 17 September 2019 with the Saigon Heat beating the Cantho Catfish in 5 games.

Teams

Venues and locations

Personnel and sponsorship

Managerial changes

Drafts

Regular season

Standings

Playoffs

Awards

Yearly awards
Fans of the year: Cantho Catfish
Assist of the year: DeAngelo Hamilton (Cantho Catfish)
Buzzer beater of the year: Lê Hiếu Thành (Cantho Catfish)
Handle of the year: Nguyễn Phú Hoàng (Cantho Catfish)
Block of the year: DeAngelo Hamilton (Cantho Catfish)
Dunk of the year: Tam Dinh (Cantho Catfish)
Favorite player of the year: Tam Dinh (Cantho Catfish)
Rookie of the year: Trương Thái Nam (Hochiminh City Wings)
Most improved player of the year: Sơn Minh Tâm (Danang Dragons)
Sportsmanship of the year: Nguyễn Văn Hùng (Danang Dragons)
Sixth man of the year: Hồng Gia Lân (Thang Long Warriors)
Defensive player of the year: Mike Bell (Hanoi Buffaloes)
Local referee of the year: Triệu Chí Thành
Coach of the year: Predrag Lukic (Hochiminh City Wings)
Local player of the year: Dư Minh An (Saigon Heat)
Heritage of the year: Vincent Nguyen (Hochiminh City Wings)
Most valuable player of the year: Tam Dinh (Cantho Catfish)

MVP of the Week

References

Footnotes

External links
 Official website

Vietnam Basketball Association seasons
2019–20 in Vietnamese basketball
2019–20 in Asian basketball leagues